The honorific prefix "The Most Honourable" is a form of address that is used in several countries. In the United Kingdom, it precedes the name of a marquess or marchioness.

Overview
In Jamaica, Governors-General of Jamaica, as well as their spouses, are entitled to be styled "The Most Honourable" upon receipt of the Jamaican Order of the Nation. Prime Ministers of Jamaica, and their spouses, are also styled this way upon receipt of the Order of the Nation, which is only given to Jamaican Governors-General and Prime Ministers.

In The Bahamas, the style "The Most Honourable" is given to governors-general, prime ministers and recipients of the Bahamian Order of the Nation.

In Barbados, recipients of the Order of Freedom of Barbados receive the style "The Most Honourable".

Certain dignitaries and recipients of honours in Africa are also styled as such. For example, those who make a significant contribution to the Bunyoro-Kitara Kingdom of Uganda, and are granted the Royal Order of the Engabu or the Royal Order of the Omujwaara Kondo, are also entitled to use the hereditary honorific style of "The Most Honourable".

In Malaysia, the Prime Minister of Malaysia and the Chief Ministers of various Malaysian states are accorded the title Yang Amat Berhormat (lit. The Most Honourable in Malay).

In addition, the names of some groups use this prefix, such as "His Majesty's Most Honourable Privy Council" in the United Kingdom.

See also
Style (manner of address)
Forms of address in the United Kingdom
The Honourable
The Right Honourable
The Most Noble
The Much Honoured

References 

Styles (forms of address)
Honorifics in the United Kingdom